Zhang Fengliu (born 15 November 1989 in Chaoyang, Liaoning) is a Chinese female wrestler, the bronze medalist in women's freestyle 75 kg wrestling at the 2016 Olympics in Rio de Janeiro, Brazil. She competes in 72 kg division and won the gold medal at the 2013 World Wrestling Championships in the same division after defeating European and Olympic champion Natalia Vorobieva of Russia.

References

External links
 

1989 births
Living people
People from Chaoyang, Liaoning
Sportspeople from Liaoning
Chinese female sport wrestlers
Olympic wrestlers of China
Olympic medalists in wrestling
Wrestlers at the 2016 Summer Olympics
2016 Olympic bronze medalists for China
World Wrestling Championships medalists
21st-century Chinese women